WQHL may refer to:

 WQHL (AM), a radio station (1250 AM) licensed to Live Oak, Florida, United States
 WQHL-FM, a radio station (98.1 FM) licensed to Live Oak, Florida, United States